İsmail Çipe (born 5 January 1995) is a Turkish professional footballer who plays as a goalkeeper for the Turkish club Boluspor in the TFF First League.

Professional career
Çipe made his professional debut with Galatasaray in a 3–0 Süper Lig win over Kayserispor on 10 November 2018.

References

External links
 
 
 
 Galatasaray profile

1995 births
Living people
People from Antakya
Turkish footballers
Turkey youth international footballers
Galatasaray S.K. footballers
Süper Lig players
TFF Second League players
Association football goalkeepers
Kayserispor footballers
Fatih Karagümrük S.K. footballers
Sportspeople from Hatay